"New Kind of Love" is a song written by Steve Bogard and Rick Giles, and recorded by Canadian country music artist Michelle Wright.  It was released in April 1990 as the first single from her album Michelle Wright. It peaked at number 4 on the RPM Country Tracks chart in September 1990.

Chart performance

Year-end charts

References

1990 singles
Michelle Wright songs
Arista Nashville singles
Songs written by Steve Bogard
Songs written by Rick Giles
1990 songs
Canadian Country Music Association Single of the Year singles